Nord 2.121 to 2.180 were a class of 60 four-cylinder 4-4-0 compound steam locomotives of the Chemins de fer du Nord; they were used as express passenger train locomotives. They were placed in service in 1898 and all but four had been retired by 1933. At the creation of the SNCF in 1938, the surviving locomotives were renumbered 2-220.A.1 to 2-220.A.4

History
Two prototypes were designed by Alfred de Glehn, of SACM and Gaston du Bousquet of the Nord. They were four-cylinder compound locomotives. In 1903, locomotives 2.121 to 2.123 and 2.126 were sold to the Compagnie du Nord - Belge who renumbered them 307 to 310.

Construction
SACM delivered two prototypes from their Belfort factory in 1891, and later delivered all the production locomotives:

References

Steam locomotives of France
2.121
4-4-0 locomotives
SACM locomotives
Railway locomotives introduced in 1891
Passenger locomotives